Amit Mishra may refer to:

Amit Mishra (born 1982), Indian cricketer
Amit Mishra (cricketer, born 1991), Indian cricketer
Amit Mishra (cricketer, born 1988), Indian cricketer
Amit Mishra (singer) (born 1989), Indian singer, songwriter and voice actor